Events in the year 1962 in Nigeria.

Incumbents
Monarch: Queen Elizabeth II
Governor-General: Nnamdi Azikiwe 
Prime Minister: Abubakar Tafawa Balewa
 Senate President: Dennis Osadebay
 House Speaker: Ibrahim Jalo Waziri
 Chief Justice: Adetokunbo Ademola

Politics
 May 1962 – Action Group, a Western Region party led by Chief Obafemi Awolowo, split into two, resulting in a crisis in western Nigeria.

References

 
1960s in Nigeria